Arkona may refer to:
 Cape Arkona on the German island of Rügen
 Arkona (band), a Russian folk metal band
 Arkona, Ontario
 Arkona, (1985-2002) a cruise ship 
 ARKONA (FüWES), an Air Command and Control System (ACCS), used by the German air force
 Arkona (2004), one of the icebreakers of Germany
 Lake Arkona, a stage of the lake waters in the Huron-Erie-Ontario basin